Rainer Böhm (23 February 1952 – 21 May 2013) was a German composer.

Life 
Born in Berlin, Böhm studied composition and conducting at the Hochschule für Musik "Hanns Eisler". Afterwards he was a master student for composition at the Academy of Arts, Berlin. In 1984 he became musical director at the Berliner Ensemble. He worked with theatre directors such as Heiner Müller,  and Manfred Wekwerth. He also wrote several scores for the documentary film director Volker Koepp.

Böhm died in Berlin at the age of 61.

Awards 
 1978: Critics Prize of the Berliner Zeitung.
 1982:  Critics Prize of the Berliner Zeitung.
 1983: Hanns Eisler Prize

Film musics 

 1971: Frankfurter Tor
 1976: Mama, I'm Alive
 1976: Hostess (Film)
 1979: Am Fluss
 1979: Tag für Tag
 1980: Blaue Pferde auf rotem Gras (Theatre recording)
 1982: In Rheinsberg
 1981: Verflucht und geliebt
 1981: Casanova auf Schloss Dux (Television play)
 1983: Mein Vater ist ein Dieb
 1984: Leben in Wittstock
 1984: Iphigenie in Aulis (Theatre recording)
 1984: Amok
 1985: Ete und Ali
 1989: Die Beteiligten
 1991: Letzte Liebe
 1993: Adamski
 1998: Victor Klemperer – Mein Leben ist so sündhaft lang
 2002: Uckermark
 2005: Schattenland – Reise nach Masuren
 2007: Holunderblüte
 2007: Söhne
 2009: Berlin-Stettin

Radio play music 
 1978:  Der Aufschub – director:  (radio play – Rundfunk der DDR)

References

External links 
 
 
 
 Rainer Böhm on Filmportal
 Rainer Böhm beim bit-Verlag
 Rainer-Böhm-Archiv in the archive of the Academy of Arts, Berlin

Male film score composers
German film score composers
20th-century classical composers
German composers
1952 births
2013 deaths
Musicians from Berlin
20th-century German male musicians